Gusti Panji Sakti was King of the Kingdom of Buleleng, in northern Bali, Indonesia, from around 1660 to 1700. He is commemorated as an heroic ancestral figure who expanded the power of Buleleng to Blambangan on East Java.
He is said to have been the son of Dalem Seganing.

References

History of Bali
Monarchs of Bali
17th-century Indonesian people